Michael John Gambrill (23 August 1935 – 8 January 2011) was a British track cyclist.

Cycling career
He competed at the 1956 and 1960 Olympic Games. At the 1956 Games he won a bronze medal in the Men's Team Pursuit, 4,000 metres.

He represented England in the 4,000 metres individual pursuit at the 1958 British Empire and Commonwealth Games in Cardiff, Wales.

Gambrill died at the age of 75 on 8 January 2011.

References

External links
Mike Gambrill - Sports Reference

1935 births
2011 deaths
Sportspeople from Brighton
English male cyclists
English track cyclists
Cyclists at the 1956 Summer Olympics
Cyclists at the 1960 Summer Olympics
Olympic medalists in cycling
Olympic bronze medallists for Great Britain
Medalists at the 1956 Summer Olympics
Cyclists at the 1958 British Empire and Commonwealth Games
Commonwealth Games competitors for England